Nycz is a Polish coat of arms. It was used by several szlachta families in the times of the Polish–Lithuanian Commonwealth.

History

Blazon

The crest is a black raven facing right holding a golden ring in its beak.  
The helm is a szachecki type. Its mantling is identical to the Jastrzębiec coat of arms.

See also

 Polish heraldry
 Heraldry
 Coat of arms
 List of Polish nobility coats of arms

Sources 
 Dynastic Genealogy 
 Ornatowski.com 

Polish coats of arms